Yoko Mimura (born November 15, 1968 in Tokoro, Hokkaido, Japan) is a Japanese curler, a three-time  (1995, 1996, 1997) and a five-time Japan women's champion (1994, 1995, 1996, 1997, 1998).

She played for Japan at the 1998 Winter Olympics, where the Japanese team finished in fifth place.

Teams

References

External links

Nagano 1998 - Official Report Vol. 3 (web archive; "Curling" chapter starts at page 236)
Yoko Mimura - Curling - Nihon Olympic Iinkai (Japanese Olympic Committee - JOC)

Living people
1968 births
Sportspeople from Hokkaido
Japanese female curlers
Pacific-Asian curling champions
Japanese curling champions
Curlers at the 1998 Winter Olympics
Olympic curlers of Japan
20th-century Japanese women
21st-century Japanese women